The 2010 Southeast Missouri State Redhawks football team represented Southeast Missouri State University as a member of the Ohio Valley Conference (OVC) during the 2010 NCAA Division I FCS football season. Led by fifth-year head coach Tony Samuel, the Redhawks compiled an overall record of 9–3 with a mark of 7–1 in conference play, winning the OVC title. Southeast Missouri State received an automatic bid to the NCAA Division I Football Championship playoffs, where the Redhawks lost in second round to the eventual national champion, Eastern Washington. The team played home games at Houck Stadium in Cape Girardeau, Missouri.

2006 was the first and only winning season in Samuel's tenure as Southeast Missouri State's head coach. It was also the Redhawks's first winning season since 2002 and first-ever FCS playoff appearance.

Schedule

Personnel

Coaching staff

References

Southeast Missouri State
Southeast Missouri State Redhawks football seasons
Ohio Valley Conference football champion seasons
Southeast Missouri State
Southeast Missouri State Redhawks football